Kulaj or Kooladj is a small village in Taleghan region in South-central Alborz mountains, Northern Iran.

Populated places in Tehran Province